Robert Hunter Wade (14 June 1916 – 7 July 2011) was a New Zealand diplomat.

Biography
Wade was born in Balclutha in 1914. He was educated at Waitaki Boys' High School before attending first University of Otago then Victoria University of Wellington where he graduated with a Master of Arts. In 1939 he began work at the New Zealand Treasury and Marketing Department. In 1941 he married Avelda Grace Petersen with whom he had two sons and two daughters.

From 1941 to 1943 he was the official secretary of the New Zealand delegation at the Eastern Group Supply Council in India then working in the New Zealand government offices. In 1947 he became assistant secretary of the New Zealand High Commission in Canberra. From 1951 to 1956 Wade was the first secretary of the New Zealand embassy in Washington D.C. before becoming director of the Colombo Plan Bureau, Colombo from 1957 to 1959. He was then head of the external aid division at the Department of External Affairs from 1959 to 1962.

Wade was New Zealand's Commissioner to Singapore from 1962 to 1963. From 1963 to 1967 he was High Commissioner of New Zealand to Malaysia. His time in Malaysia coincided with the Indonesia–Malaysia confrontation where New Zealand diplomatically and militarily supported the Malaysian government. He was then posted to London and was New Zealand's deputy High Commissioner. Briefly in 1968 he served as acting High Commissioner to the United Kingdom for a period after Sir Thomas Macdonald retired from the post and before a permanent successor could arrive in London.

He was New Zealand Ambassador to Japan (as well as Ambassador South Korea, resident in Tokyo) from 1969 to 1972. From 1972 to 1974 he was Commonwealth Deputy Secretary-General for Economic Affairs and Development. He was then New Zealand Ambassador to West Germany from 1975 to 1978.

Bonn was his last posing and Wade retired in 1978. His wife died in 1991 and he died at his home in Howick in 2011. He was survived by three of his children and six grandchildren.

Notes

References

1916 births
2011 deaths
People educated at Waitaki Boys' High School
University of Otago alumni
Victoria University of Wellington alumni
New Zealand diplomats
High Commissioners of New Zealand to Singapore
High Commissioners of New Zealand to Malaysia
High Commissioners of New Zealand to the United Kingdom
Ambassadors of New Zealand to South Korea
Ambassadors of New Zealand to Japan
Commonwealth Deputy Secretaries-General
Ambassadors of New Zealand to Germany